Shock Headed Peters were a British post-punk band, formed in 1982. The band took their name from the 19th-century German's children book Der Struwwelpeter ("Shockheaded Peter") by Heinrich Hoffmann.

History 
In 1982, Karl Blake formed Shock Headed Peters with Ashley Wales, eventually adding Dave Knight, then Mark Rowlatt and Clive Glover.

From 1984–86, the band often toured with The Dave Howard Singers.

Shock Headed Peters disbanded in October 1987 before reforming in 1990, again with founder-members Blake and Knight. Drummer/percussionist Dave Smith of Guapo occasionally played with the second incarnation of Shock Headed Peters. The band collaborated with Danielle Dax on "Hate On Sight", a track included on Dax's 1995 album Comatose Non-Reaction: The Thwarted Pop Career of Danielle Dax.

Discography 
I, Bloodbrother Be (EP and single, 1984), él Records
The Kissing of Gods (EP and single, 1985), él Records
Not Born Beautiful (LP, 1985), él Records
Life Extinguisher (EP, 1986), Beach Culture — features a collaboration with David Cross
Fear Engine (LP, 1987), Produkt Korps
Several Headed Enemy (CD, 1992), Cyclops Prod
Fear Engine II - Almost As If It Had Never Happened (CD, 1993), Cyclops Prod
Tendercide (CD, 1996), Cyclops Prod
Not Alone (Compilation, contributing track) (2006)

References 
 Banks, Joe. "Anniversary: Shock Headed Peters’ Fear Engine II: Almost As If It Had Never Happened," The Quietus (December 31, 2013).

English post-punk music groups
1982 establishments in England
Musical groups established in 1982